Gongidi Sunitha Mahender Reddy (born 16 August 1969) is an Indian politician. She is a member of the Telangana Legislative Assembly representing Alair constituency of Yadadri Bhuvanagiri district and also Government Whip. She is a member of Telangana Rashtra Samithi party.

Early life
Karingula Sunitha Rani was born on 16 August 1969 in Hyderabad, Telangana to Sarala and Narsimha Reddy, in a lower-middle-class family. She did her schooling from Wesley Girls High School, Secunderabad and B.Com. from Osmania University.

Career
Sunitha Reddy worked in a private company during her graduation to support her family. Even after her marriage she remained in her job until her political entry.

Political career
She entered politics in June 2001 by joining TRS party. She won as Yadagirigutta MPTC, MPP from 2001 to 2006. She was State General secretary in TRS Party during 2002. She won the post of Sarpanch in 2006 - 2011 from Vangapally. She is a member of TRS Politbureau since 2009.

She won the 2014 Assembly elections with a majority of over 30,000 over Budida Bixmaiah Goud of the Indian National Congress. In the 2018 Telangana Legislative Assembly election, she was re-elected with a majority of 33086 votes.

She also worked with an NGO, HELP, that works for employability of underprivileged women.

Political statistics

Personal life
Sunitha married Gongidi Mahender Reddy, a TRS party member in 2001. She has two daughters.

References

1969 births
Living people
Telangana MLAs 2014–2018
Telangana Rashtra Samithi politicians
Women in Telangana politics
21st-century Indian women politicians
21st-century Indian politicians
Telangana MLAs 2018–2023